The White Arcades (1988) is an album performed by Harold Budd. The album was recorded at various locations, including Palladium in Edinburgh, and the Cocteau Twins studio in London. Individual tracks were engineered by Robin Guthrie and Brian Eno.

Two documentaries by Ric Burns Coney Island and The Donner Party use the track The White Arcades and others from this album.

Track listing
 "The White Arcades" – 4:44
 "Balthus Bemused by Color" – 5:16
 "The Child with a Lion" – 6:38
 "The Real Dream of Sails" – 6:08
 "Algebra of Darkness" – 6:32
 "Totems of the Red-Sleeved Warrior" – 3:23
 "The Room" – 3:07
 "Coyote" – 2:45
 "The Kiss" – 3:17

See also
1988 in music

References

Harold Budd albums
1988 albums
All Saints Records albums
Ambient albums by American artists